Vision Christian Radio is an Australian narrowcast radio station owned and operated by Vision Christian Media, an affiliate of United Christian Broadcasters. It broadcasts a Christian radio format of music and talk from studios in the Brisbane suburb of Underwood, to a network of more than 720 AM and FM radio frequencies.

The station first broadcast on 1 February 1999 as Vision FM, with a single transmitter located at Beaudesert, Queensland. By 2001 it had established around 40 transmission sites, and 156 by 2004. The network's growth was assisted first by the purchase of 16 High-Powered Open Narrowcast (HPON) licenses in Western Sydney in 2002, and thereafter other HPON licenses in Victoria and Western Australia. In 2016, the Australian Communications and Media Authority (ACMA) reported that it had 507 radio transmitters across Australia in all mainland states.

Programming and availability
A single national programming feed is broadcast to more than 780 towns, suburbs and cities in Australia, as well as remote areas via the Viewer Access Satellite Television platform. Major centres covered include Brisbane, Western Sydney, Melbourne, Adelaide, Perth and the Gold Coast.

The station broadcasts a mix of contemporary Christian music, messages from Christian national and international speakers and practical teaching. Vision also produces a national news service which is also syndicated to Christian community radio stations in Australia.

Controversy
In 2016, following an on-air segment with American Bible teacher Chuck Missler in which he criticised the Roman Catholic Church, Vision Christian Radio was found to have breached ACMA's Code of Conduct about acknowledging and responding to written complaints. ACMA dismissed related complaints that the network had perpetuated hatred or vilification during the interview.

Vision180
Vision180 is a youth-focussed Christian radio station streaming online, as well as being broadcast on 87.6FM in St George, Queensland.

Bibliography

References

External links
Vision Christian Media website
Vision Christian Radio website

Radio stations in Brisbane
Radio stations in Queensland
Radio stations in Sydney
Radio stations in New South Wales
Radio stations in Melbourne
Radio stations in Victoria
Radio stations in Adelaide
Radio stations in South Australia
Radio stations in Perth, Western Australia
Radio stations in Western Australia
Christian radio stations in Australia
Community radio stations in Australia
Australian radio networks
Radio stations established in 1999
1999 establishments in Australia